Ammoniphilus is a Gram-variable, strictly aerobic, rod-shaped, haloalkalitolerant spore-forming, obligately oxalotrophic and motile bacterial genus from the family of Paenibacillaceae with peritrichous flagella. In the cell wall of Ammoniphilus is meso-diaminopimelic acid.

References

Further reading 
 
 

Paenibacillaceae
Bacteria genera